Miodrag Jokić (born 25 February 1935) was the last commander of the Yugoslav Navy. The International Tribunal for the Former Yugoslavia (ICTY) sentenced him to 7 years in prison for murder, cruel treatment, attacks on civilians, devastation, unlawful attacks on civilian objects, destruction or wilful damage done to institutions in Dubrovnik during the 1991 siege.

Biography
Jokić was born in Serbia and educated in the Yugoslav military-naval academy. In 1991, after serving as an officer for a number of years, he was promoted to Vice Admiral and then to the Commander of the 9th VPS of the Yugoslav navy. After Croatia declared independence from Yugoslavia that year, the Yugoslav Army invaded the Dubrovnik area and started a three-month siege in order to keep that territory under Yugoslav control. The siege failed and the army had to retreat, while the international community condemned the attacks.

In 2001, the ICTY charged Jokić, Pavle Strugar, Milan Zec and Vladimir Kovačević on several counts. These included violations of the customs of war and attacks on the UNESCO heritage site of the Old Town. Strugar and Jokić voluntarily surrendered to the court, becoming the first Serbian or Montenegrin citizens to do so. His surrender sparked protests in Serbia.

On 1 April 2003, Jokić pleaded guilty to six counts in his second indictment and thus no trial was necessary. He admitted his guilt and expressed his remorse for his actions in Dubrovnik:

The ICTY considered his remorse in openly admitting guilt as a mitigating factor and thus sentenced him to 7 years in prison. He also testified against his superior Strugar during his trial at the ICTY. In 2008, he was released from prison.

See also
Siege of Dubrovnik
Croatian War of Independence

Notes

External links 
Article on Hague Justice Portal

1935 births
Montenegrin soldiers
Serbian soldiers
Generals of the Yugoslav People's Army
Montenegrin people convicted of murder
People convicted by the International Criminal Tribunal for the former Yugoslavia
Montenegrin people convicted of war crimes
Living people
Defence ministers of Serbia